Pro-Design GmbH is an Austrian aircraft manufacturer based in Innsbruck. It was founded in 1986, in Natters. The company specializes in the design and manufacture of paragliders and powered parachute canopies, in the form of ready-to-fly aircraft.

The company is a Gesellschaft mit beschränkter Haftung, an Austrian limited liability company.

Reviewer Noel Bertrand described the company in a 2003 review as having a very "well-balanced range" of gliders. At that time the company's line included the two-place Carrier, beginner Effect, intermediate Jazz and Pro-Ject, plus the Titan.

The company also makes heavy parafoil wings under the name Sycon Aircraft.

Aircraft 

Summary of aircraft built by Pro-Design:

Pro-Design Accura
Pro-Design Amiga
Pro-Design Aquila
Pro-Design Burst
Pro-Design Corrado
Pro-Design Carrier
Pro-Design Challenger
Pro-Design Combi-Cut
Pro-Design Compact
Pro-Design Companion
Pro-Design Contest
Pro-Design Eole
Pro-Design Cuga
Pro-Design Effect
Pro-Design Fly
Pro-Design High
Pro-Design Jalpa
Pro-Design Jazz
Pro-Design Kestral
Pro-Design Lamna
Pro-Design Max
Pro-Design Monster
Pro-Design Pro-Feel
Pro-Design Pro-Ject
Pro-Design Relax
Pro-Design Rrow
Pro-Design Thema
Pro-Design Thermik
Pro-Design Thesis
Pro-Design Titan
Pro-Design X-Fire

References

External links

Aircraft manufacturers of Austria
Ultralight aircraft
Powered parachutes
Paragliders
Manufacturing companies established in 1986
Austrian companies established in 1986